The 59th New York Film Festival took place from September 24 to October 10, 2021. Unlike the 2020 New York Film Festival, which was staged online due to the COVID-19 pandemic, the 2021 festival returned to physical screenings at the Lincoln Center.

Joel Coen's The Tragedy of Macbeth was announced as the opening film with Pedro Almodóvar's Parallel Mothers announced as the closing film. Jane Campion's The Power of the Dog was the festival's centerpiece screening.

Main slate

Spotlight

Currents

Short films

Revivals

Amos Vogel Centenary Retrospective

References

New York Film Festival
New York
New York Film Festival